Fragile is a 2005 Spanish-British horror film directed by Jaume Balagueró.

Plot
On the Isle of Wight, a train accident on the Island Line means that the main hospital, St. James's, is completely full and unable to take in any more patients. A smaller and older hospital, Mercy Falls, is being closed down, but some of the patients, including the children's ward, need to remain at the site until there is availability elsewhere.

One of the children, Maggie, an orphan suffering from severe cystic fibrosis, tells the night nurse, Susan, that she has seen "her" again, frightening Susan. Another child, Simon, suffers a broken leg and is rushed to the X-ray department. No one knows how his leg broke but as Simon lies on the X-ray table, his femur inexplicably suffers a second fracture.

Susan leaves the hospital on sick leave and Amy Nicholls replaces her. Amy bonds with Maggie as both are orphans. Maggie explains to Amy that there is a girl called Charlotte who lives in the abandoned ward upstairs. Roy, the operations manager, explains to Amy that Charlotte is an urban legend that has been seen by several children over the past two decades. Simon later tells Amy that Charlotte is the one who broke his leg. Amy visits Susan to ask why she left but learns that Susan died in an accident. She meets two local psychics, who explain that Charlotte can only be seen by those who are close to death.

Back at Mercy Falls, the children watch Sleeping Beauty and Maggie says that true love's kiss has special power. Amy looks at the files of the other children who'd mentioned Charlotte. All of these children are deceased; Amy realizes that Maggie must be close to death. Later, Roy is killed by Charlotte after she causes him to have a  major nose bleed then violently forces him backward through a window.

Amy goes up to the second floor through a hidden trapdoor. She finds an old photograph of a girl in a wheelchair with a nurse and a film-reel which shows the girl on a medical treatment for osteogenesis imperfecta or "brittle bone disease". The photograph is labelled, "Charlotte and Mandy, 1959." Charlotte begins to appear in front of a metal door shown as a grey tall figure with braces on her legs. Maggie saves Amy, dropping her favorite blanket, "Mr. Sleepy" in the process. Amy and Dr. Robert view the film and Robert explains the disease Charlotte suffered from was a sickness that causes the patient's bones to be susceptible to fractures. Doctors had built metal, orthotic braces for Charlotte to wear, in the hopes of strengthening her bones. Amy now believes Charlotte is the angry ghost of the little girl who is hurting the children. She searches the records but no child called Charlotte existed.

Amy finally learns why the upstairs ward is closed. The nurse caring for the little girl had become obsessed with her. When the treatments began to work and the child improved, she started purposely breaking the girl's bones and eventually murdered the child. She then put on the child's metal,  orthotic braces and leapt down an elevator shaft, to her death. Robert shows Amy a file he found which proves that "Mandy" is the child's name and "Charlotte" is in fact, the obsessed nurse. Amy realizes Charlotte wants the children.

The hospital starts falling apart because of Charlotte's rage as the staff desperately try to evacuate the children, assisted by additional staff from St. James's. As help arrives, Amy realises that everything is suddenly calm, and Mrs. Folder says that Maggie is missing. Amy realises that Maggie went to get her 'Mr Sleepy' and runs to the abandoned ward. Weak and exhausted, Maggie is in Mandy's old room. Despite Charlotte's presence, Amy determinedly picks up Maggie and tries to reach the trapdoor but Charlotte causes the floor to destabilise and Amy's leg is impaled by a piece of metal, causing major bleeding. As the two escape the second floor by jumping through the trapdoor, Maggie succumbs to her illness and stops breathing. Despite Amy's desperate attempts, the little girl dies in her arms. Amy then also collapses from blood loss.

Robert futilely tries to revive her with a defibrillator but Amy's heart stops beating. As the medical team step back, we see Maggie's ghost give Amy a "pure love" kiss, similar to the one she watched in Sleeping Beauty earlier, and Amy begins to breathe again. The movie ends as Amy wakes up in a different hospital with Robert at her side. An elderly patient notices Maggie's smiling ghost sitting on  Amy's bedside - staying close to what she loved best in life.

Cast 
 Calista Flockhart as Amy Nicholls
 Richard Roxburgh as Robert Marcus
 Elena Anaya as Helen Perez
 Gemma Jones as Mrs./Dr. Folder
 Yasmin Murphy as Maggie Reynolds 
 Colin McFarlane as Roy
 Michael Pennington as Marcus
 Daniel Ortiz as Matt
 Susie Trayling as Susan
 Karmeta Cervera/ Julieta Marocco as Charlotte Rivers
 Ivana Baquero as Mandy Phillips

Production
Fragile was filmed between Barcelona, Spain and the Isle of Wight, England. The exterior scenes of the hospital were filmed at
Bearwood House in Berkshire, England.

The Sleeping Beauty animation short seen on the projector was created specifically for this movie.

Release
The film premiered on 2 September 2005 as part of the Venice Film Festival and was released in a theatrical release in Spain on 14 October 2005. The movie has had several release dates around the world since its original release in October 2005. Lightning Media released the film in July 2010 via DVD, Video on Demand and Digital Download. Fragile is also part of the Fangoria FrightFest 2010 on 21 June 2010.

See also 
 List of Spanish films of 2005
 List of British films of 2005
List of ghost films

References

External links
 
 

2005 films
2005 horror films
Films shot in Barcelona
Haunted house films
Spanish horror films
English-language Spanish films
Films directed by Jaume Balagueró
Films with screenplays by Jaume Balagueró
British horror films
Osteogenesis imperfecta in films
2000s English-language films
2000s British films
2000s Spanish films
Spanish haunted house films